Jonathan Enrique Moncada Zeledón (born 3 January 1998) is a Nicaraguan footballer who plays as a defensive midfielder for the Peruvian club Walter Ferretti and the Nicaragua national team.

Career
A youth product of the Nicaraguan club Real Estelí, Moncada began his senior career with a short stint with the Latvian club Spartaks Jūrmala in 2018. He shortly after returned to Nicaragua with Real Madriz, before moving to Deportivo Ocotal the following season in 2019. He moved to Walter Ferretti in 2021, and helped them win the  2021 Copa Nicaragua.

International career
Moncada debuted with the senior Nicaragua national team in a 6–0 CONCACAF Nations League win over Anguilla on 14 October 2018.

Honours 
Walter Ferretti
Copa de Nicaragua: 2021

References

External links
 
 

Living people
1998 births
People from Estelí Department
Nicaraguan men's footballers
Nicaragua international footballers
FK Spartaks Jūrmala players
Real Madriz FC players
Deportivo Ocotal players
C.D. Walter Ferretti players
Nicaraguan Primera División players
Association football midfielders
Nicaraguan expatriate footballers
Nicaraguan expatriate sportspeople in Latvia
Expatriate footballers in Latvia